The FIBT World Championships 1938 took place in St. Moritz, Switzerland (Two-man) and Garmisch-Partenkirchen, Germany (Four-man). St. Moritz hosted the two-man event for the first time after hosting the four-man event previously in 1931, 1935, and 1937 while Garmisch-Partenkirchen hosted the four-man event previously in 1934.

Two man bobsleigh

Four man bobsleigh

Medal table

References
2-Man bobsleigh World Champions
4-Man bobsleigh World Champions

IBSF World Championships
Sport in Garmisch-Partenkirchen
Sport in St. Moritz
1938 in bobsleigh
International sports competitions hosted by Germany
Bobsleigh in Germany
1937 in German sport
International sports competitions hosted by Switzerland
Bobsleigh in Switzerland 
1937 in Swiss sport